Suwałki is a city in northeastern Poland with a population of 69,206 (2021). It is the capital of Suwałki County and one of the most important centers of commerce in the Podlaskie Voivodeship. Suwałki is the largest city and the capital of the historical Suwałki Region. Until 1999 it was the capital of Suwałki Voivodeship. The Czarna Hańcza river flows through the city.

Etymology
The name derives from Lithuanian su- (near) and valka (creek, marsh), with the combined meaning "place near a small river or swampy area".

History

The area of Suwałki had been populated by local Yotvingian and Prussian tribes since the early Middle Ages. However, with the arrival of the Teutonic Order to Yotvingia, their lands were conquered and remained largely depopulated in the following centuries.

17th century
The village was founded by Camaldolese monks, who in 1667 were granted the area surrounding the future town by the Grand Duke of Lithuania and the King of Poland John II Casimir. Soon afterwards the monastic order built its headquarters in Wigry, where a monastery and a church were built.

The new owners of the area started rapid economic exploitation and development of the forests; they brought enough settlers (mainly from overpopulated Masovia) to build several new villages in the area. Also, production of wood, lumber, tar and iron ore was started. The village was first mentioned in 1688; two years later it was reported to have just two houses.

18th century

However, the growth of the village was fast and by 1700 it was split into Lesser and Greater Suwałki. The village was located almost exactly in the center of Camaldolese estates and lay on the main trade route linking Grodno and Merkinė with Königsberg.

In 1710 King Augustus II the Strong granted the village a privilege to organize fairs and markets. Five years later, in 1715, the village was granted town rights by the grand master of the order, Ildefons. The town was divided into 300 lots for future houses and its inhabitants were granted civil rights and exempted from taxes for seven years. In addition, the town was granted  of forest that was to be turned into arable land. On May 2, 1720, the town rights were approved by King August II, and the town was allowed to organize one fair a week and four markets a year. In addition, a coat of arms was approved, depicting Saint Roch and Saint Romuald.

After the Partitions of Poland in 1795, the area was annexed by Prussia. In 1796 the monastery in Wigry was dissolved and its property confiscated by the Prussian government. The following year a seat of local powiat authorities was moved to the town, as well as a military garrison. By the end of the 18th century, Suwałki had 1,184 inhabitants and 216 houses. A large part of the population was Jewish.

19th century

In 1807 Suwałki became a salient of the newly formed Duchy of Warsaw and one of the centres of the department of Łomża. After the defeat of Napoleon Bonaparte and the Congress of Vienna, the area was incorporated into the Congress Poland ("Russian Poland"), as a part of the Russian Empire (Russian partition). The status of a powiat capital was briefly withdrawn, but it was reintroduced on January 16, 1816, when the Augustów Voivodeship was created and its government was gradually moved to Suwałki. Soon afterwards the older town hall was demolished and replaced with a new one, and General Józef Zajączek financed the paving of most of the town's streets. The cemetery was moved to the outskirts from the town centre, and that area became a town park. Also, the Russian authorities built the Saint Petersburg–Warsaw Railway, which added to the town's prosperity.

In 1820 a new church was built. In 1821 the first synagogue was opened. In 1829 a permanent post office was opened in Suwałki. Between 1806 and 1827 the town's population almost tripled and reached 3,753 people living in 357 houses. During the November Uprising of 1831, the town's population took part in the struggles against Russia, but the town was pacified by the Russian army on February 11, 1830. In 1835 the government of Tsar Nicholas I decided not to move the capital of the voivodeship to Augustów. Two years later the Voivodeships of Poland were re-designated as gubernias, and the town became the capital of the Augustów Gubernia.

In 1826 the Russians passed an investment plan and authorities initiated the construction of new public buildings. In 1835 a police station was built, in 1844 a new town hall and Orthodox and Protestant churches were completed. Soon afterwards a new marketplace was opened, as well as St. Peter's and Paul's hospital and a gymnasium. In addition, between 1840 and 1849 the main Catholic church was refurbished by many of Poland's most notable architects of the era, including Piotr Aigner, Antonio Corazzi and Enrico Marconi. To change the town's architecture and break with its rural past, in 1847 the town council passed a decree banning the construction of new wooden houses.

The town's population continued to grow rapidly. In 1857 it had 11,273 inhabitants and in 1872 almost 20,000. Newly built factories needed workers and these were brought from workers recruited widely in Europe. The mixed Polish-Jewish-Lithuanian population was soon joined by people of almost all denominations that worshipped in the Russian Empire.

Soon Suwałki became the fourth-most populous town in Congress Poland. After the January Uprising of 1863, administration reform was passed to unify the Polish lands with Russia completely. In 1866 the gubernia of Augustów was renamed to Suwałki Gubernia. However, the route of the newly built Saint Petersburg-Warsaw railway bypassed Suwałki, adversely affecting its prosperity. It was not until the early 20th century that the establishment of a new Russian army garrison revived the economy. Also, a railway line linking Suwałki with Grodno was finally completed.

20th century to present

After the spring of 1905, when the Russians were forced to accept a limited liberalization, the period of Polish cultural revival started. Although the Polish language was still banned from official use, new Polish schools were opened, as well as a Polish-language Tygodnik Suwalski weekly and a library. After World War I broke out, heavy fights for the area erupted. Finally in 1915, the Germans broke the Russian front and Suwałki was under German occupation. The town and surrounding areas were detached from the rest of the Polish lands and were directly administered by the German military commander of the Ober-Ost Army. Severe laws imposed by the German military command and the tragic economic situation of the civilians led to the creation of various secret social organisations. Finally, in 1917, local branches of the Polska Organizacja Wojskowa were created.

After the collapse of the Central Powers in November 1918, the local commander of the Ober-Ost signed an agreement with the Temporary Council of the Suwałki Region and de facto allowed for the region to be incorporated into Poland. However, the German army remained in the area and continued its economic exploitation. In February 1919 the local inhabitants took part in the first free elections to the Polish Sejm, but soon afterwards the German commanders changed their mind. They expelled the Polish military units from the area and in May passed the territory to Lithuanian authority.

Independent Poland
By the end of July 1919, the Paris Peace Conference granted the town to Poland. As the newly-established border was disapproved of by the Polish government, it organised the Sejny Uprising on August 23, 1919. The Polish-Lithuanian War erupted and for several days fights were fought for the control over Suwałki, Sejny and other towns in the area. The war ended on the insistence of the Entente in mid-September. Negotiations took place in Suwałki in early October. During the Polish-Bolshevik War, the town was captured by the Communists and, after the Battle of Warsaw, it was again passed to the Lithuanians. It was retaken by the Polish Army.

In the interbellum period, Suwałki became an autonomous town within the Białystok Voivodeship (1919-1939). This resulted in another period of prosperity, with the town's population rising from 16,780 in 1921 to almost 25,000 in 1935. The main source of income shifted from agriculture to trade and commerce. Also, in 1931 the new water works and a power plant were built. Also, Suwałki continued to serve as one of the biggest garrisons in Poland, with two regiments of the Polish 29th Infantry Division and almost an entire Suwałki Cavalry Brigade stationed there. Beginning in 1928, Suwałki was established as the headquarters of one of the battalions of the Border Defence Corps.

Second World War

During the later stages of the Polish Defensive War of 1939, the town was briefly captured by the Red Army. However, on October 12 of the same year, the Soviets withdrew and transferred the area to the Germans, in accordance with the Molotov–Ribbentrop Pact. The city was renamed Sudauen and annexed directly into Nazi Germany's province of East Prussia. Germans carried out mass arrests of Poles as part of Intelligenzaktion in the fall of 1939 and spring of 1940. Arrested Poles were deported to a transit camp in Działdowo or murdered on the spot. Nazi German severe laws and terrorism led to the creation of several resistance organisations in response. Although most initially destroyed by the Gestapo, by 1942 the area had one of the strongest ZWZ and AK networks. In the Szwajcaria district there are mass graves of members of the Polish resistance movement murdered by the Germans on April 26, 1940 and April 1, 1944.

Despite the resistance, almost all of the town's once 7,000-strong Jewish community was deported and murdered, beginning in December 1939, when German troops brought the elderly, sick, and disabled into a nearby forest and machine-gunned them en masse. The Germans, with help from local collaborators, deported the community's surviving Jews to ghettos in other towns. Nearly all either perished there or were murdered in Nazi concentration camps. The occupying Germans also systematically destroyed all traces of Jewish history and culture in the town, demolishing synagogues and desecrating Suwałki's Jewish cemetery, where a memorial and wall of gravestone fragments stand today.

Also, in Suwałki's suburb of Krzywólka, the Germans established a POW camp for almost 120,000 Soviet prisoners of war. On October 23, 1944, the town was captured by the forces of the Soviet 3rd Belarusian Front. The fights for the town and its environs lasted for several days and took the lives of almost 5,000 Soviet soldiers before they defeated the Germans. The anti-Soviet resistance of former Armia Krajowa members lasted in the forests surrounding the town until the early 1950s.

Suwałki did not suffer much damage during World War II, most of the historic buildings survived the war, and the damage to the city was estimated at only 5-10%, which was quickly rebuilt.

Polish People's Republic
The apparatus subordinate to the Polish Committee of National Liberation took power in Suwałki without major problems. Immediately after the city's liberation by units of the Red Army, on October 23, 1944, at 3:00 PM Stanisław Łapot, a member of the former Communist Party of Poland, one of the organizers of the Polish Workers' Party in Bialystok, came from Sejny to Suwałki, as well as the representative of the Provincial National Council in Bialystok in the Suwałki District and his Starosta. He was accompanied by several officials previously organized in Sejny of poviat authorities with the deputy head of Edmund Przybylski, as well as Tadeusz Sobolewski - the president of the interim (hull) Poviat Council. On the same day, at Mickiewicz Square, supposedly spontaneously organized, so with the participation of new authorities and over five thousand inhabitants of the city, and then in the "Rusałka" cinema hall a meeting of representatives of the population with the envoys of the Polish Committee of National Rebirth. Actions aimed at organizing the Suwałki authorities were taken shortly after the liberation. The Starosta handed over the power in the city to the temporary mayor Tadeusz Sobolewski on October 24, 1944, who earlier in Sejny was a member of the City Council, City Board, and also the mayor. The commissariat of Suwałki was established. In turn, on November 7, a conference of representatives of provincial authorities with local authorities was held. As agreed, the first meeting of the Suwałki City Council took place the next day. On November 20, 1944, the board decided to locate its office in a private, Jewish building, partly abandoned, at 62/64 Kościuszki street (occupied by German offices during the war), as the town hall building was severely damaged. In December 1944, the City Board did not gather, and its functions were performed by President T. Sobolewski.

The transitional state in the organization and functioning of the Suwałki authorities was properly completed in January 1945. Most probably then or at the beginning of February the staroste S. Łapot issued an oral but very important order to subordinate Suwałki to the administration of the poviat level. In this way, he deprived them of the status they had until September 1939, a city separated from the poviat municipal association. Over the next few years, this matter was dealt with by various authorities, from municipal to central. This controversial problem appeared on March 27, 1945, on the initiative of the mayor Tadeusz Sobolewski, at the third meeting of the City National Council. The governor Wacław Kraśko, who was present at it, was rather reluctant to propose separating the city from the poviat and pointed to the need to improve, first and foremost, the situation and condition of municipal enterprises. The Council decided to postpone the case.

Another politician calling for restoring Suwałki to restore legal status before September 1, 1939 was mayor Wacław Rudzki. At the Municipal National Council meeting on March 25, 1946, he submitted the first motion to separate the city from the poviat, which was motivated by prestigious, historical and financial considerations. The Council shared the submitted arguments and decided, through the Poviat National Council, to apply to the Voivodeship National Council in Bialystok with a request to include the city separated from poviat self-government associations. Much more radical decisions, undoubtedly also under the influence of W. Rudzki, MRN made at its meeting on May 27, 1946. She decided that the rescript of the Ministry of Internal Affairs of December 1919 about the separation of Suwałki from the poviat remains in force, therefore she is the council of the separated city and reports to the Provincial National Council in Bialystok. The Council also elected, without discussion and by acclamation, the incumbent mayor of the city, mayor W. Rudzki. After this revolt, the reaction of the superior authorities was swift. Already in mid-June 1946, the voivode demanded that the chairman of the Suwałki Poviat Department (staroste) suspend the implementation of the Municipal National Council resolutions of 27 May, while informing that in the matter of restoring Suwałki's rights as a separate city, he turned to the Ministry of Public Administration. And indeed the voivode, writing favorably about Suwałki, their development and the achievements of the authorities, mainly W. Rudzki, asked the ministry for guidelines and a suggestion of a positive resolution of the case, although the relevant regulations did not allow it, mainly because the number of inhabitants of the city did not reach 25,000 After the lapse of the month, Rudzki not only did not become president, but also resigned from the position of mayor. Nevertheless, on July 25, 1946, the MRN decided to send a delegation of councilors composed of Leon Bracławski, Józef Wiszniewski and Antoni Zalewski to the Ministry of the Interior to support current activities and accelerate the restoration of Suwałki's rights of a separated city.

Martial law
During the martial law period and rise of Solidarność in the early 1980s, Solidarność demanded that the buildings of the Polish United Workers' Party and the Citizens' Militia be handed over to be used for social infrastructure, primarily schools, kindergartens and hospitals. This position was taken by the Inter-Enterprise Founding Committee of the Solidarity Independent Trade Union in Giżycko and Suwałki in regards to the party complex in 83 Noniewicza street. The first round of talks on this matter with representatives of authorities (including central authorities) took place on January 28, 1981. Solidarność emphasized the that the newly built buildings could be turned into medical clinics, a community center for youth and a music school. It strengthened its position with over 18 thousand signatures from the inhabitants of the region. No agreement was reached, because the authorities did not want to hand over the building.
Before the next round of talks on the night of February 14–15, under the cover of the Citizens' Militia and Security Service, the PZPR KW was moved to new buildings. This action caused widespread indignation in the whole province, not only among the members of Solidarity.
After the war, Suwałki was retained as the capital of the powiat. However, the heavily damaged town recovered very slowly, and the Communist economic system could not support the reinvestment needed. In 1975 new administrative reform was passed; Suwałki was designated as the capital of a separate Suwałki Voivodeship. The number of inhabitants rose rapidly, and by the end of the 1970s, the population was over 36,000. Large factories were built in the town, and it became one of the important industrial and commercial centres of Eastern Poland.

Following the end of Communist rule in 1989, Suwałki had a difficult period in transitioning to a new economic system. Most of the town's major factories were inefficient and went bankrupt. Creation of the Suwałki Special Economic Zone and the proximity of the Russian and Lithuanian borders opened new possibilities for local trade and commerce. In addition, the region began to attract many tourists from all around the world. In the 21st century, residents of Suwałki frequently travel across the Russian and Lithuanian borders for shopping trips as well as to make use of the various attractions both countries offer.

According to the 2002 census, the city had a Lithuanian community of 326 people.

To the military planners of NATO, an area of the Lithuania–Poland border area is known as the Suwałki Gap because it represents a military difficulty. It is a flat narrow piece of land, a gap, that is between Belarus and Russia's Kaliningrad exclave and that connects the three NATO-member Baltic States to Poland and the rest of NATO.

Demographics

Climate
Suwałki has a climate that is characterised by changeable weather patterns. The city has a warm-summer humid continental climate (Köppen: Dfb) and, relatively to the rest of Poland, the city's climate has markedly continental characteristics even though there is some moderation from the Baltic Sea.

The weather changes are common due to the fact that, like in the rest of Poland, weather fronts generated by low-pressure areas come along frequently. Due to its northerly location and the relatively little moderation of the Baltic, the growing season around the city is the shortest in Poland; according to the data from 1995-2019, the period of sustained average daily temperatures exceeding  was only 200 days long, about 20-30 days shorter than in central and southern Poland.

Winters are just cold enough, if the  isotherm is accepted, not to be classified as oceanic (Köppen: Cfb). The skies are often overcast and snow is frequent in the season, but there is much less precipitation in the winter months than in the sunnier summer months. Nights with temperatures below  sometimes occur, and temperatures below  are not unheard of. According to the Institute of Meteorology and Water Management (IMGW), the snow stays there for the longest time in non-mountainous areas of Poland. The city is so cold that before 2015, Suwałki was only one of the four cities in Poland to have experienced winter conditions in every period from December to February (defined as the daily mean temperature of the month going below ); the extremely anomalous winter of 2019/2020 was the first in which Suwałki did not experience such conditions. 

Summers are pleasant, warm and often sunny, with the maximum daily temperatures sometimes exceeding , though the season is still somewhat cooler in the city, as compared to the rest of Poland.

Tourist attractions

Kościuszko street with classicist architecture
Romantic 19th-century park
St. Alexander's Church
St. Peter's and Paul's Church
Chłodna Street pedestrian zone
District Museum at the former Resursa (trading point)
Town Hall (Ratusz)
Former gymnasium building
Museum of Polish poet Maria Konopnicka at her childhood home
Monument to Maria Konopnicka
Andrzej Strumiłło Gallery
19th century brewery of Wacław Kunc
Childhood home of Polish painter Alfred Kowalski
Cemetery complex on Bakałarzewska street (Roman Catholic, Orthodox, Protestant, Jewish and Muslim)
Suwałki Plaza, a shopping mall and cinema complex that opened in 2010. The mall contains stores with various products such as groceries, books, clothing, shoes and accessories.

Education
Wyższa Szkoła Służby Społecznej im. Ks. Franciszka Blachnickiego
Wyższa Szkoła Suwalsko-Mazurska im. Papieża Jana Pawła II
Państwowa Wyższa Szkoła Zawodowa w Suwałkach

Sport

The volleyball team Ślepsk Suwałki is based in Suwałki. It plays in the PlusLiga, Poland's top division. The football club Wigry Suwałki is based in the town. They currently play in the IV liga, the fifth tier of the Polish football league system. They dropped from II liga in 2022 for financial reasons.

Notable people

Over the centuries Suwałki has produced a number of persons who have provided unique contributions to the fields of science, language, politics, religion, sports, visual arts and performing arts. A list of recent notable persons includes, but is not limited to:
Maria Andrejczyk (born 1996), javelin thrower
Zalman Gradowski (1910–1944), secret diarist at Auschwitz-Birkenau
Maria Konopnicka (1842–1910), poet and novelist, author of the poem Rota
Alfred Kowalski (1849–1915), painter
Henryk Minkiewicz (1880–1940), general, killed in the Katyn Massacre
Avraham Stern (1907–1942), Zionist paramilitary leader, codename 'Yair' founder of Lehi
Edward Szczepanik (1915–2005), economist and the last Polish Prime Minister in Exile
Andrzej Wajda (1926–2016), film director and recipient of an Honorary Oscar
Pinchas Sapir (1906–1975), Minister of Finance of Israel

International relations

Twin towns – sister cities
Suwałki is twinned with:

See also
 Augustów Canal
 Lithuania–Poland border
 Suwałki Region

Notes

References

External links

 
Suwalki Town Webpage 
Kurier Suwalski 
Information and Links on Suwalki
Local media Suwałki 

 
Cities and towns in Podlaskie Voivodeship
City counties of Poland
17th-century establishments in the Polish–Lithuanian Commonwealth
Populated places established in the 17th century
Trakai Voivodeship
Suwałki Governorate
Białystok Voivodeship (1919–1939)
Holocaust locations in Poland